Lehar Khan (born 4 July 1999) is an Indian actress and model who works in the Hindi film industry, short films and TV ads.

Filmography

Films

Short films

Web series

Dance
Kids' Dhoom
Punjab Kesari Little Star
Aja Nachle

Other work 
Maggie ad as Rajkumari

References

External links

1999 births
Actresses in Hindi cinema
Indian film actresses
Indian stage actresses
Living people